Fénix (English: Phoenix) is the third studio album by American singer Nicky Jam. It was released on January 20, 2017, by Industria Inc., Sony Music Latin and RCA Records. It was produced by Yhoan Manuel Jiménez Londoño, Johnattan Gaviria, Urbani Mota, Jorge Luis Romero, Egbert Rosa Cintron, Rvssian, Saga WhiteBlack, Jowan, Supa Dups, Pedro Reynoso, Banx & Ranx, Carlos "Maffio" Peralta, Carlos Paucar and Jorge Fonseca and features collaborations with Plan B, Sean Paul, Konshens, J Balvin, Wisin, El Alfa, Cosculluela, Daddy Yankee, Messiah, MineK, Arcángel, Valentino, Enrique Iglesias and Kid Ink.

At the 18th Annual Latin Grammy Awards, the album was nominated for a Latin Grammy Award for Album of the Year while "El Amante" was nominated for Best Urban Fusion/Performance and Best Urban Song. Additionally, the song "El Perdón" won Best Urban Fusion/Performance two years prior in 2015. The album also won Top Latin Album of the Year at the 2018 Billboard Latin Music Awards.

The album proved to be a massive hit and gained Nicky Jam worldwide recognition. It reached the top position on both the Top Latin Albums and Latin Rhythm Albums chart, being his first and only number-one album on both charts to date. Additionally, it was certified platinum in United States and Mexico.

Background
The album was the first studio album by Nicky Jam in ten years after the release of The Black Carpet in 2007, the album followed a period of drug addiction that kept him away from recording music. The name of the album, "phoenix" in English, is inspired by the immortal creature of Greek mythology, Nicky Jam has said that "I was even in jail, I was in the worst moments of my life, I had a very dark moment in my life where people no longer gave a penny for me, where people didn't want to listen to my music, that's why I identify with the phoenix, that's why the album is called Fénix". 

The cover of the album is a picture of a mural painted by the collectibe PeopWall of Nicky Jam in Medellin, Colombia, Jam dedided to feature the mural on the cover after being tagged by the collective on Instagram. Prior to the release the album, he embarked on the Fénix Tour, that started on July 2, 2016, at the Philips Arena in Atlanta, United States and featured appearances from Zion & Lennox, De La Ghetto and Valentino. Following its release, he promote it with a series of concerts in countries such as Mexico, where he performed at Monterrey, Mexico City and Guadalajara. The album includes English versions of the songs "El Perdon", as "Forgiveness", and "Hasta el Amanecer", as "With You Tonight", the latter features American rapper Kid Ink.

Singles
The song "El Perdón" with Spanish singer Enrique Iglesias was released on February 6, 2015. The song was commercially successful reaching the top positions in various countries such as France and Spain, as well as topping the Hot Latin Songs chart in United States. It also peaked at number 56 on the Billboard Hot 100 chart, being Nicky Jam's first appearance on the chart. The song "Hasta el Amanecer" was released on January 15, 2016, and also reached number at the Hot Latin Songs chart, being his second number-one song in the chart.

"El Amante" was released as the third single for the album on January 15, 2017. The fourth single was "Si Tú La Ves", a collaboration with Puerto Rican singer Wisin released on July 28, 2017. The first three singles were certified platinum in United States with "El Perdon" selling over 1,6 million copies as of 2017.

Track listing

Charts

Weekly charts

Year-end charts

Certifications

References

2017 albums
Nicky Jam albums
Pina Records albums
Albums produced by Luny Tunes
Albums produced by Rafy Mercenario